The 1958–59 Scottish League Cup was the thirteenth season of Scotland's second football knockout competition. The competition was won by Heart of Midlothian, who defeated Partick Thistle in the Final.

First round

Group 1

Group 2

Group 3

Group 4

Group 5

Group 6

Group 7

Group 8

Group 9

Supplementary Round

First Leg

Second Leg

Quarter-finals

First Leg

Second Leg

Semi-finals

Final

References

General

Specific

1958–59 in Scottish football
Scottish League Cup seasons